Greg Bennett (born 2 January 1972, in Sydney, New South Wales) is a motivational speaker, corporate trainer, and entrepreneur. He is a retired professional Olympic athlete from Australia.  He competed in triathlon since the age of 15 as a student at Newington College (1984–1989). Greg became a dual Australian and USA citizen in 2012.

Bennett has won two International Triathlon Union World Series titles, one Triathlon World Championship, six World Cup titles, as well as being ranked world number one triathlete in 2002 and 2003. Bennett qualified for the Australian Olympic team at Athens, 2004 and Beijing, 2008 Summer Olympics. At the 2004 Summer Olympics. He placed fourth with a total time of 1:51:41.58. Greg has won three Australian National titles in 1998, 1999, 2000 (long course), two Oceania titles in 1998 and 1999.

Bennett started eighty two ITU World Cups, won six and was on the podium twenty three times. Bennett represented Australia at thirteen World Championship Triathlons, three World Duathlon Championships with a silver medal in 2002, two goodwill games and qualified for two Australian Olympic teams.

Bennett won the world's richest ever Triathlon prize purse in 2007 by winning all 5 of the Life Time Fitness Grand Slam city series, which included the LTF Minneapolis Triathlon, Nautica New York Triathlon, Accenture Chicago Triathlon, Kaiser Permanente Los Angeles and the Toyota USA Open Dallas Triathlon.

Bennett won the Life Time series for three consecutive years 2006, 2007 and 2008. In the process Greg won eleven of fifteen starts, he was second in one and third in the remaining three. Bennett placed second in the 2009 Life Time Fitness series even after being hit by a car in August 2009 at the completion of a training ride in his home town of Boulder, CO.

Bennett won the 2011 World Championship (no drafting) in Des Moines, Iowa. He was just shy of his 40th Birthday.

Bennett was voted Triathlete of the year in 2003 and 2007 by Triathlete magazine and voted top 15 greatest triathlete of all time by inside Triathlon magazine 2012.

Bennett raced for 28 years as a professional. He competed in over 500 professional Triathlons and had 100+ international wins.

Greg Bennett is married to US Olympic Triathlete Laura Bennett. Laura Bennett raced the 2008 Beijing Olympics and 2012 London Olympics and like Greg finished in 4th place in Beijing. Often heralded throughout their careers as the ‘worlds fittest couple’, there’s little debate that the Bennett’s were worthy contenders of that title during their 16 years as Married Professional Triathletes.

Results 

World Triathlon Series Champion  2002 and 2003
Ironman 5150 Triathlon World Champion, 2011
Three time Australian National Champion  1998, 1999, 2000 (long course)
Three time USA Grand Slam Series Champion  2006, 2007, 2008
Triathlete Of The Year 2003 and 2007 
Awarded the International Triathlon Union Presidents Cup in 2002

Undefeated Gram Slam Series Champion in 2007  
 Minneapolis
 New York
 Chicago
 Los Angeles
 Dallas

Over 100 International wins including:

Major USA Titles
 Four time Los Angeles Triathlon 2000, 2006, 2007, 2008
 Four time New York Triathlon 2006, 2007, 2008, 2009
 Two Time Chicago 2007, 2014
 Two time Dallas 2007, 2008

Six time World Cup Champion
 Monaco 1997
 Sydney, Australia 1999
 Cancun, Mexico 2001
 Hamburg, Germany 2002
 Gamagori, Japan 2002
 Ishigaki, Japan 2003

Six Ironman 70.3 from 12 starts
 Augusta USA 2009
 Hawaii USA 2012
 Vineman USA 2012
 Muncie, Indiana 2012
 Raleigh, North Carolina 2013
 Buffalo Springs Texas USA 2013

Represented Australia at Triathlon World Championships 1994 - 2010
 Wellington, NZ 1994
 Cancun, Mexico 1995 
 Cleveland, US 1996 
 Perth, Australia 1997 
 Lausanne Switzerland 1998 
 Montreal Canada 1999 
 Perth, AU 2000 
 Cancun Mexico 2002 
 Queenstown NZ 2003 
 Madera, Portugal 2004 
 Gamagori, Japan 2005 
 Lausanne Switzerland 2006 
 Vancouver Canada 2008
 Budapest Hungary 2010

Represented Australia at Duathlon World Championships – 1999 - 2005
 North Carolina USA, 1999
 Georgia USA, 2002
 Newcastle Australia, 2005

Represented Australia at Olympic Games
 Athens Greece 2004
 Reserve
 Sydney Australia 2000
 Beijing China 2008

Represented Australia at Goodwill Games
 New York USA 1997
 Brisbane Australia 2001

References

External links 
 Bennett Endurance Website
 Greg Bennett's Twitter

1972 births
People educated at Newington College
Australian male triathletes
Living people
Olympic triathletes of Australia
Triathletes at the 2004 Summer Olympics
Duathletes
Sportspeople from Sydney
20th-century Australian people
21st-century Australian people